Francisco Gabriel Arellano Espinosa is a Mexican politician, a member of the Moviento Regenaración Nacional (MORENA), and former municipal president of the Aguascalientes municipality. He also served in the Congress of Aguascalientes from 2010 to 2013 as a member of the Institutional Revolutionary Party (PRI) before leaving the party in 2015.

See also
 List of mayors of Aguascalientes

References

Living people
Institutional Revolutionary Party politicians
Year of birth missing (living people)
21st-century Mexican politicians
Municipal presidents of Aguascalientes
Members of the Congress of Aguascalientes
Politicians from Aguascalientes